Contrast CT, or contrast enhanced computed tomography (CECT), is X-ray computed tomography (CT) using radiocontrast. Radiocontrasts for X-ray CT are generally iodine-based types. This is useful to highlight structures such as blood vessels that otherwise would be difficult to delineate from their surroundings. Using contrast material can also help to obtain functional information about tissues. Often, images are taken both with and without radiocontrast. CT images are called precontrast or native-phase images before any radiocontrast has been administrated, and postcontrast after radiocontrast administration.

Bolus tracking

Bolus tracking is a technique to optimize timing of the imaging. A small bolus of radio-opaque contrast media is injected into a patient via a peripheral intravenous cannula.  Depending on the vessel being imaged, the volume of contrast is tracked using a region of interest (abbreviated "R.O.I.") at a certain level and then followed by the CT scanner once it reaches this level.  Images are acquired at a rate as fast as the contrast moving through the blood vessels.

This method of imaging is used primarily to produce images of arteries, such as the aorta, pulmonary artery, cerebral, carotid and hepatic arteries.

Washout
"Washout" is where tissue loads radiocontrast during arterial phase, but then returns to a rather hypodense state in venous or later phases. This is a property of for example hepatocellular carcinoma as compared to the rest of the liver parenchyma.

Phases
Depending on the purpose of the investigation, there are standardized protocols for time intervals between intravenous radiocontrast administration and image acquisition, in order to visualize the dynamics of contrast enhancements in different organs and tissues. The main phases thereof are as follows:

Angiography

CT angiography is a contrast CT taken at the location and corresponding phase of the blood vessels of interest, in order to detect vascular diseases. For example, an abdominal aortic angiography is taken in the arterial phase in the abdominal level, and is useful to detect for example aortic dissection.

Amount

Adults
The following table shows the preferable volume in normal weight adults. However, dosages may need to be adjusted or even withheld in patients with risks of iodinated contrast, such as hypersensitivity reactions, contrast-induced nephropathy, effects on thyroid function or adverse drug interactions.

The dose should be adjusted in those not having normal body weight, and in such cases the adjustment should be proportional to the lean body mass of the person. In obese patients, the Boer formula is the method of choice (at least in those with body mass index (BMI) between 35 and 40):

For men: Lean body mass = (0.407 × W) + (0.267 × H) − 19.2

For women: Lean body mass = (0.252 × W) + (0.473 × H) − 48.3

Children
Standard doses in children:

Adverse effects

Iodinated contrast agents may cause allergic reactions, contrast-induced nephropathy, hyperthyroidism and possibly metformin accumulation. However, there are no absolute contraindications to iodinated contrast, so the benefits needs to be weighted against the risks.

As with CT scans in general, the radiation dose can potentially increase the risk of radiation-induced cancer.

The injection of iodinated contrast agents may sometimes lead to its extravasation

See also
Computed tomography of the abdomen and pelvis#Contrast administration

Notes

References

External links

X-ray computed tomography